Drennan is a surname alleged to be of multiple distinct origins. Variations of the name are found primarily in Ireland, Scotland, and the United States, however, Irish and Scottish families of this name may not necessarily be related. The surname is purportedly derived from the Gaelic Ó Droighneáin, Ó Draighnáin, or Ua Draighnen, meaning "descendant of Draighnen", or "descendant of blackthorn". Variant spellings include Drennen, Drenning, Drennon, Drinan, Drinnan, Drinnon, and Drynan. Thornton is another Anglicized surname from the same original Gaelic form.

Background

The Irish Uí Draighnáins, a descendant clan of the dynasty of Uí Maine, specifically claiming descent from the Síol Anmchadha branch, were chiefs of the country lying around Sliabh Eisi, on the borders of County Clare and Galway. They were formerly hereditary chief Brehons or judges of the principalities of Hy-Many and Hy-Fiachra Aidhne, in South Connacht, and had their chief residence at a place called Ard-na-Cno, in the parish of Killiny, and barony of Kiltartan, as we are informed in the Book of Lecan: "To the Aes Brengair belongs the stewardship of the arch-chief of Hy-Many, and it is the office of the Ui-Draighnen to distribute justice to the tribes."

Further Information

According to statistics cited by Patrick Hanks, 1,113 people on the island of Great Britain and 592 on the island of Ireland bore the surname Drennan in 2011. In 1881 there were 404 people with the surname in Great Britain, primarily at Renfrewshire, Ayrshire, Lanarkshire, and Lancashire. In mid-19th-century Ireland, people with the surname Drennan were found mainly at County Laois and County Kilkenny. The 2010 United States Census found 4,233 people with the surname Drennan, making it the 7,821st-most-common name in the country. This represented an increase in absolute numbers, but a decrease in relative frequency, from 3,927 (7,811th-most-common) in the 2000 Census.

Notable people

Alexander Drennan (1899–1971), New Zealand labourer, trade unionist, communist and watersider
Alexander Murray Drennan (1884–1984), Scottish pathologist
America McCutchen Drennan (1830–1903), American educator and missionary
Anthony Drennan (born 1958), Irish guitarist
Bruce Drennan (born 1950), American sports announcer
Bryce W. Drennan (born 1963), American writer
Cathy Drennan, American professor of chemistry and biology
Charles Drennan (born 1960), New Zealand Roman Catholic bishop
Ellie Drennan (born 1998), Australian singer-songwriter
John Drennan, Irish journalist and writer
John Drennan (cricketer) (born 1932), Australian cricketer
John Cherry Drennan (1899–1983), Northern Ireland politician
John Swanwick Drennan (1809–1893), Irish poet
Kathryn M. Drennan, American writer
Keity Drennan (born 1990), Panamanian model
Mandy Drennan (born 1988), Australian Paralympic swimmer
Mark Drennan (born 1972), American politician from West Virginia
Martin Drennan (1944-2022), Irish Roman Catholic bishop
Michael Drennan (born 1994) Irish professional footballer
Robert Drennan, American archaeologist
Samuel Drennan (1819–1882), Irish-born merchant and politician in Ontario, Canada
Thomas Drennan (1696–1768), Irish Presbyterian minister
Thomas J. Drennan (1877–1928), New York City Fire Commissioner
William Drennan (1754–1820), Irish poet
William Melville Drennan (1853–1900), merchant and politician in Ontario, Canada

References

Surnames of Irish origin